Maharagama East Grama Niladhari Division is a Grama Niladhari Division of the Maharagama Divisional Secretariat of Colombo District of Western Province, Sri Lanka. It has Grama Niladhari Division Code 527B.

Maharagama East is a surrounded by the Maharagama West, Pathiragoda, Udahamulla West and Pamunuwa Grama Niladhari Divisions.

Demographics

Ethnicity 
The Maharagama East Grama Niladhari Division has a Sinhalese majority (94.5%). In comparison, the Maharagama Divisional Secretariat (which contains the Maharagama East Grama Niladhari Division) has a Sinhalese majority (95.7%)

Religion 
The Maharagama East Grama Niladhari Division has a Buddhist majority (92.4%). In comparison, the Maharagama Divisional Secretariat (which contains the Maharagama East Grama Niladhari Division) has a Buddhist majority (92.0%)

References 

Grama Niladhari Divisions of Maharagama Divisional Secretariat